The Bruceton Subdivision is a railroad line owned by CSX Transportation in the U.S. State of Tennessee. At its east end the line continues west from the Nashville Terminal Subdivision and at its west end the line continues west as the Memphis Subdivision.

See also
 List of CSX Transportation lines

References

CSX Transportation lines
Rail infrastructure in Tennessee
Louisville and Nashville Railroad